Andrew Serwer (born September 16, 1959) is an American journalist and editor in chief of Yahoo Finance. He oversaw Fortune from 2006 to 2014 as managing editor. He is based in Manhattan.

Biography
Serwer grew up in the Washington, D.C. area and is a 1981 graduate of Bowdoin College. He joined Fortune in 1984 as a reporter and was later promoted to associate editor.

Between 1995 and 1998, Serwer was a senior writer at Fortune. In 1997, he gained attention for writing an online column, then a novelty, called "Street Life" about the personalities and stories on Wall Street. "Achaea had Homer, the Spanish Civil War had Hemingway, California had the Beach Boys, and now our hyperactive stock market has its own poet-singer—Andy Serwer," James Collins wrote in the May 22, 2000, issue of The New Yorker. The column later evolved into "Captain's Blog."

He has written a number of Fortune cover stories, including profiles of Microsoft co-founder Bill Gates, Oracle co-founder Larry Ellison, and Cisco CEO John Chambers. In 2000, NewsBios named Serwer Business Journalist of the Year, calling him "perhaps the nation's top multimedia talent, successfully juggling the roles of serious journalist, astute commentator and occasional court jester."

Serwer was a regular contributor on CNN's "American Morning" and served as a co-host of CNN's "In The Money." He has also appeared on ABC's Good Morning America, NBC's The Today Show and CBS This Morning and has written for Time, Sports Illustrated, Politico, and SLAM Magazine.

Serwer was named managing editor of Fortune in November 2006, replacing Eric Pooley.  In August 2014, Serwer left the company when executives appointed Alan Murray as the new top editor.

In 2015, Serwer became the Editor-in-Chief of Yahoo Finance. On the last day of 2022, he announced he was leaving Yahoo. 

Serwer received the 45th Elliott V. Bell Award from the New York Financial Writers' Association in 2021.

Serwer is a member of the board of trustees of Bowdoin College.

See also
 New Yorkers in journalism

References

External links
 Archive of Fortune articles

1959 births
American magazine editors
American reporters and correspondents
American television journalists
Bowdoin College alumni
Living people
Bethesda-Chevy Chase High School alumni
Fortune (magazine) people
American male journalists
20th-century American journalists
21st-century American journalists
20th-century American male writers
21st-century American male writers